TeamLab is  an international art collective, an interdisciplinary group of artists formed in 2001 in Tokyo, Japan. The group consists of artists, programmers, engineers, CG animators, mathematicians and architects who refer to themselves as “ultra-technologists". TeamLab creates artworks using digital technology. Since 2014 TeamLab is represented by Pace Gallery.

History 
TeamLab was founded in 2001 by Toshiyuki Inoko and four of his friends.

TeamLab initially made little profit, but began to grow its reach through the creation of websites and smartphone applications, as well as office and store designs for outside corporations.

In 2011, artist Takashi Murakami invited the collective to make its debut at the Singapore Biennale. In 2014, the New York PACE Gallery began to help promote TeamLab’s work. TeamLab organized its own exhibition in Tokyo in 2015.

In 2020, TeamLab has sued MODS (Museum of Dream Space) for allegedly imitating its artwork and violating its copyrights. They have been fighting a legal battle for two years.

Exhibitions

MORI Building Digital Art Museum
TeamLab Borderless is jointly operated by Mori Building Co., Ltd and TeamLab. It opened on 21 June 2018 in Tokyo, Japan.

TeamLab’s exhibition Massless was the opening project of the Amos Rex Museum in Helsinki, Finland in 2018.

The second digital museum was opened in Shanghai on November 5, 2019.

In September 2020, the exhibition began at Dongdaemun Design Plaza(DDP) in Seoul, South Korea. The exhibition was extended in Seoul until August 2021.

Digital artwork 

TeamLab creates digital artwork which is based on the concept of borderless, and integrates advanced technologies. The exhibitions are powered by EPSON digital technology.

TeamLab projects aim to show the relationship between nature and artificial creations, immersing the recipient’s body in an interactive world.

TeamLab Borderless museum features a collaborative creative space Future Park and Tea House.

Steve Aoki has described the museum as “a virtual reality/augmented reality/fantasy theme park.”

TeamLab also serves as the principal developer for the Tokyo Disney Resort app, in partnership with Disney Parks, Experiences and Products Technology and Digital.

Permanent art installations
Singapore has the most TeamLab permanent exhibitions outside of Japan. These include places such as the National Museum of Singapore, Jewel Changi Airport, Marina Bay Sands, Gardens by the Bay and the CapitaSpring.

In late 2020, TeamLab premiered "Resonating Life in the Acorn Forest" a permanent art installation at the Kadokawa Culture Museum at Tokorozawa Sakura Town in Tokorozawa, Japan. Situated in the Musashino forest it consists of color-changing ovoid shapes in the woods which respond which to touch and wind. During the day the silver ovoid shapes reflect their forest surround but at night the trees in the part of the woods where the instillation is placed are individually flooded with colored light as are the sculptured interactive shapes.

References

External links
 Official website

Japanese installation artists
2001 establishments in Japan
Arts organizations established in 2001
Interactive art